Kampong Long Mayan is a village in the interior of Tutong District, Brunei, about  from the district town Pekan Tutong. The population was 265 in 2016. It is one of the villages within Mukim Ukong, a mukim subdivision in the district.

Facilities 
 is the village mosque; it was inaugurated on 1 February 1998 by the then Minister of Religious Affairs.

References 

Long Mayan